Vadapadimangalam estate was a mirasdari estate in the Tiruvarur district of Tamil Nadu, India. It was owned by a Mudaliar family of the Vellalar caste. The estate originated as a grant of land to the family who operated as Pattakdars or revenue collectors on behalf of the Thanjavur Maratha ruler Thuljaji.

Vadapadimangalam estate covered a total area of 8,004 acres in 1951 and was one of the largest estates in the erstwhile Tanjore district of Madras Presidency, British India alongside Poondi, Ukkadai and Kunniyur.

References 
 
Tiruvarur district